Cefin Tower was a proposed class A office building in Bucharest, Romania, with 36 floors and a surface of 40,000 m2. The building were to be part of an 85,000 m2 development that would have included a 5-star hotel and a commercial gallery.

External links
 Reference
Details on Emporis

Proposed buildings and structures in Romania
Skyscrapers in Romania